Cockcroft or Cockroft is a surname. Notable people with the surname include:

Cockcroft:
 Barry Cockcroft (1933–2001), British television documentary director
 Barry Cockcroft (dentist), Chief Dental Officer (CDO) for England
 Bill Cockcroft, former Chief Scout Commissioner of England 
 Colin Cockcroft (1918–1987), South African military commander
  (1946–), Canadian asthmologist; see Cockcroft-Gault formula
 George Cockcroft (born 1932), American novelist who published under the name Luke Rhinehart
 Sir John Douglas Cockcroft (1897–1967), British nuclear physicist
 The Cockcroft Institute, British research centre for accelerator physics named after Sir John D. Cockcroft
 Cockcroft, lunar crater named after Sir John D. Cockcroft
 John Hoyle Cockcroft (born 1934), British Conservative politician
 Shamshad Cockcroft, British physiologist
 Vic Cockcroft (born 1941), English footballer
 Wilfred Cockcroft (1923–1999), English mathematician

Cockroft:
 Don Cockroft (born 1945), American football player
 Hannah Cockroft (born 1992), British athlete, gold medallist at the 2012 and 2016 Paralympics
 Joe Cockroft (1911–1994), English footballer
 Lana Coc-Kroft (born 1967), New Zealand television and radio personality
 Peter Cockroft (born 1957), British weather forecaster
 Josh Cockroft (born 1989), Oklahoma Representative